Poulan is a brand name of the Swedish manufacturer Husqvarna AB.

History
Poulan was founded as Poulan Saw Co. in 1946 by chainsaw pioneer Claude Poulan in Shreveport, Louisiana. Purchased in late 1950s or early '60 by the Beaird Company, also of Shreveport, it was known as Beaird-Poulan. The company was acquired by Emerson Electric in 1972, and was purchased by Electrolux in 1984. In 2006 Electrolux spun off Husqvarna  into its own company.

Poulan brand today
The Poulan brand name is used primarily for outdoor power equipment, such as chainsaws, lawn mowers, and leaf blowers, aimed at the mid-level consumer market. Since Poulan is owned by Husqvarna, the two brands often share technologies.  In recent years Poulan has offered a more upscale "Poulan Pro" brand employing a black and gold color scheme instead of Poulan's traditional green. As a result, Poulan products have been pushed even further upmarket.

References

External links 
 

Manufacturing companies of Sweden
Garden tool manufacturers
Power tool manufacturers
Tool manufacturing companies of Sweden